Changzhou is a prefecture-level city in southern Jiangsu, China. It was previously known as Yanling, Lanling, and Jinling. Located on the southern bank of the Yangtze River, Changzhou borders the provincial capital of Nanjing to the west, Zhenjiang to the northwest, Wuxi to the east, and the province of Zhejiang to the south. Changzhou is located in the highly developed Yangtze Delta region of China extending from Shanghai going northwest. The population of the Changzhou Municipality was 4,592,431 at the 2010 census. The city is the birthplace of Zhou Youguang who created the pinyin romanization system.

History
The ruins of Yancheng have been unearthed in Changzhou's Wujin District, a walled settlement founded near the beginning of the Zhou dynasty around 1000BC.

Changzhou proper is first attested as a commandery (jun) established near the beginning of the Qin in 221 BC. Changzhou got its present nameChinese for "ordinary district"in 589 under the Sui. Following the completion of the Grand Canal in 609, Changzhou prospered as a stop along its course. During the interregnum between the Sui and Tang, the city of Piling was even the capital of Shen Faxing's short-lived Liang Kingdom (AD 619 to 620). 

Changzhou served as a prefectural seat (fu) of Ming Nanzhili and the Qing provinces of Jiangnan and Jiangsu. In the 1850s and 1860s, the Taiping Rebellion held the area. One of five palaces housing the leaders of Taiping was constructed in Changzhou. Today the ruins of the "King's Palace" can be found near the People's No. 1 Hospital.

In the 1920s, Changzhou started to attract cotton mills. The cotton industry got a boost in the late 1930s when businesses began relocating outside of Shanghai due to its Japanese occupation. On January 1, 1953, Changzhou was set as provincially administrated municipality. 

In 1958, Zhenjiang Prefecture was renamed as Changzhou Prefecture, and the administration office was moved from Zhenjiang to Changzhou. Changzhou was incorporated by Changzhou Prefecture. In 1959, Changzhou Prefecture was changed into Zhenjiang Prefecture, and the administration office was moved from Changzhou to Zhenjiang. Changzhou was incorporated by Zhenjiang Prefecture. In 1960, Wujin County of Zhenjiang Prefecture was incorporated into Changzhou. In 1962, Changzhou was changed into provincially administrated municipality and Wujin County was incorporated into Zhenjiang Prefecture. Unlike many Chinese cities, Changzhou continued to prosper even during the upheavals of the 1966–76 Cultural Revolution. In 1983, when the municipally affiliated county system was carried out, Wujin County, Jintan County and Liyang County of Zhenjiang were incorporated into Changzhou. The urban area was divided into five municipally administrated districts, Guanghua, Tianning, Zhonglou, Qishuyan and Jiaoqu. At that time, Changzhou administrated three counties and five districts. From September 1986, as approved by State Council, Guanghua District was revoked and the previous administrative area was incorporated into Zhonglou District and Tianning Districrt. Liyang County was changed into Liyang City (county level). At that time, Changzhou administrated one city, two counties and four districts. In 1993, Jintan County was changed into Jintan City. In 1995, Longhutang Town, Xinqiao Town, Baizhang Town and Weitang Town of Wujin County were incorporated into Jiaoqu District. As approved by State Council on June 8 of 1995, Wujin County was promoted to Wujin City, with the government set in Hutang Town. In 1999, as approved by the provincial government, Taixiang Town of Jiaoqu District was revoked and incorporated into Xueyan Town of Wujin City. Today, Changzhou is an industrial center for textiles, food processing, machinery such as diesel engines, generators, and transformers, and high technology. The rural counties surrounding it are noted for the production of rice, fish, tea, silk, bamboo, and fruit.

Administration

The prefecture-level city of Changzhou administers seven county-level divisions, including five districts and one county-level city.

Demographics
Its total population was 4,592,431 inhabitants at the 2010 census, an average 2% per year increase since the previous census, and 3,290,918 lived in the built-up area made up of 5 urban districts.

Education
Changzhou is an educational hub and is home to several universities, including Changzhou University, Hohai University (Changzhou campus), Jiangsu Teachers' University of Science and Technology, Jiangsu Teachers' University of Technology, and Changzhou Institute of Technology. The city also has a number of prominent secondary schools, including the Changzhou Senior High School of Jiangsu Province.

As the first education park taking higher vocational education as its distinguishing feature in China, Changzhou Higher Vocational Education Base was called the “cradle of silver-collar workers”. Every year, it cultivated 20,000 technological talents to the Yangtze River Delta area. 100% of the graduates signed employment contracts and the one-off employment rate was higher than 98%. There are 5 higher vocational colleges and an undergraduate college in the park, which have realized the cross-school study, common credit and resource sharing. A large number of highly qualified vocational talents were cultivated here. Based on this, Changzhou Scientific Education Town was founded. It cooperates with foreign universities in America, Canada, Britain and Germany, etc., domestic universities like Nanjing University, scientific institutes and hi-tech enterprises in constructing nearly 100 laboratory, practice, training, and technological R&D centers. Presently, it is marching towards the national sample vocational education area, experimental area of production, teaching and research, and the cluster area of scientific innovation. Many central leaders such as Hu Jintao, Jia Qinglin and Luo Gan have paid inspection visits here and spoke highly of it.

Economy
Changzhou's traditional role has been that of a commercial center and in particular a distribution center for agricultural produce, which was shipped by canal to the north and later, to Shanghai. The city began to develop a cotton textile industry in the 1920s, and cotton mills were established in the late 1930s, when Japanese attacks drove many Chinese businesses to invest outside Shanghai.

The city has remained a textile center and the most important location in Jiangsu Province for weaving. It also has large food-processing plants as well as flour-milling, rice-polishing, and oil-pressing industries. After 1949 it also developed as a centre of the engineering industry. Other engineering works in Changzhou produce diesel engines, generators, transformers along with agricultural and textile machinery. At the time of the Great Leap Forward in 1958 a steel plant was also built to provide raw material for heavy industry.

Since 1908, Changzhou has been linked by rail with Shanghai and Nanjing (see below for transportation).

Up until now, Changzhou has remained one of the most developed cities in Jiangsu, ranked third after Suzhou and Wuxi. The city's 2009 GDP per capita of ¥70,103 in 2009, less than that of Suzhou and Wuxi but more than the capital city Nanjing, ranked the city third in Jiangsu.

Changzhou is also one of the top business cities in China. According to Forbes ranking, Changzhou was the 9th best business city in mainland China in 2008. Changzhou data was reported at 662.228 RMB bn in Dec 2017. This records an increase from the previous number of 577.386 RMB bn for Dec 2016. China's CN: GDP: Jiangsu: Changzhou data is updated yearly, averaging 130.818 RMB bn from Dec 1991 to 2017, with 25 observations. The data reached an all-time high of 662.228 RMB bn in 2017 and a record low of 10.545 RMB bn in 1991. China's CN: GDP: Jiangsu: Changzhou data remains active status in CEIC and is reported by National Bureau of Statistics. The data is categorized under China Premium Database's National Accounts – Table CN.AE: Gross Domestic Product: Prefecture Level City.

Industrial zones

Changzhou Export Processing Zone 
Near to Shanghai and Nanjing via convenient transportation links, the zone began operation in October 2006. Investors enjoy a series of preferential policies whilst all handle export procedures are handled inside the export processing zone. The zone focuses on electronic information, electromechanical integration and new materials.

Changzhou National Hi-Tech District 
Changzhou National Hi-Tech District (CND) is a state-level high-tech industrial development zone. It is located in the northern part of Changzhou city. The district represents the highest-level and most sophisticated industrial park in Changzhou. More than 1,300 foreign companies and over 5,000 local industrial enterprises have been registered within the district of which around 40% are from European and American countries. Industries encouraged include engineering machinery, transformer & transmission equipment, automotive, locomotive & locomotive components, parts, precision machinery, biotechnology, pharmaceuticals, photo-voltaic (PV) and new materials, chemicals, garment and textiles production, computer software and research & development. Some major investors include Terex, Komatsu, Ashland Chemical, Johnson, Caltex Oil Corp., Disa, +GF+, Rieter and General Electronics.

Changzhou used to be one of the birthplaces of the national modern industry in China. Sheng Xuanhuai, who was honored as the "Father of China's Industry", bent all his efforts in the modern factory and mine communications. He created 11 "No.1" in China, including the first telecommunication enterprise. In the end of Qing Dynasty and the early days of the Republic of China, the textile, mechanical and food industries of Changzhou were rapidly developing. In 1906, the first capitalist manufacturing factory, Jinyu Textile Factory appeared. In 1932, the famous industrialist, Liu Guojun, founded the integration mode of spinning, weaving and dyeing. It had a pioneer meaning in the 1930s. During the 1980s, Changzhou became the star industrial city that was famous all over China, and created the "South Jiangsu Mode" with the characteristics of the times, the developed town industry. As the traditional and advantageous industry of Changzhou, the equipment manufacturing industry has been developing in recent years. Changzhou has formed 6 great national characterized industrial bases, that is, agricultural implement and machinery manufacturing, power transmission and transforming manufacturing, automobile and accessories manufacturing, new textile, track traffic and new coating. Presently, the power transmission and transforming manufacturing industry is the first in China, and the track traffic vehicle and accessories manufacturing base is famous in East China and all over the country. The engineering machinery and vehicle industry has shown its strong growth momentum. By the end of 2010, Changzhou has had 26 national famous brands, 175 provincial famous brands and 327 municipal brands. The number of national famous brands is the third in Jiangsu. The good pattern of multi-level development and echelon improvement, which takes the national brand as the orienting role, the provincial brand as the body and the municipal brand as the reserve, has been initially formed. 
Changzhou is becoming a modern equipment manufacturing city with prominent domestic advantages and large potential.

Climate
The climate is Humid Subtropical Cfa, with cool winters and hot and humid summers.
Changzhou has a wide range of temperature differences throughout the year.

Transportation

Metro

The Line 1 of the Changzhou Metro opened on 21 September 2019.
The Line 2 opened on 28 June 2021.

Railway
Located just south of the Chang Jiang (Yangtze River), Changzhou station is situated on the original Beijing–Shanghai railway. Changzhou North station was completed in 2011 and is located in the north of Changzhou in the Xinbei district on the Beijing–Shanghai high-speed railway. Changzhou is also one of the main stops on the busy Shanghai–Nanjing intercity railway, with two stations located in Changzhou (Changzhou station and Qishuyan station).

Air travel
There are domestic flights to Beijing, Guangzhou, Chengdu, Shenyang, Kunming, Harbin and Dalian, and international flights to Macau, Taiwan, South Korea, Thailand, Vietnam, Indonesia and Japan.

Highways and Expressways
China National Highway 312
Shanghai-Nanjing Expressway (part of G42 Shanghai-Chengdu Expressway) (Shanghai-Suzhou-Wuxi-Changzhou-Zhenjiang-Nanjing)
Yanjiang Expressway (part of G4221 Shanghai-Wuhan Expressway, formerly Jiangsu S38 Changshu-Hefei Expressway)
Jiangsu S58 Shanghai-Changzhou Expressway 
Jiangsu S39 Jiangyi Expressway 
G4011 Yangzhou-Liyang Expressway (Jintan and Liyang only) 
G4012 Liyang-Ningde Expressway (Liyang only) (Liyang section)
G25 Changchun-Shenzhen Expressway (Liyang only) (Rizhao-Hangzhou section)
Jiangsu S48 Shanghai-Yixing Expressway (Wuxi-Yixing section)

Bus rapid transport(BRT) system
Use of the BRT System costs one yuan and provides access throughout Changzhou. The BRT-only stations and road sections have the following specifications: separate bus lanes or bus-only roadways, a vast network of routes and corridors, high capacity buses operating both outside and inside these corridors, greater passenger volume as compared to that in mixed traffic lanes (about 3000 pphpd), enhanced station environments (not just simple bus shelters), pre-boarding fare collection and fare verification, electric buses, centralized system controls, real-time next bus information app, segregated bike lanes along main corridor(s) as well as station access for disabled persons. The following cities also have BRT systems: Beijing, Chongqing, Dalian,  Guangzhou, Jinan, Hangzhou, Hefei, Kunming, Xiamen, Zhengzhou and Ürümqi.

Elevated freeways
Changzhou has a network of four elevated freeways: the Longcheng Avenue in the north, the Longjiang road in the west, the Qingyang road in the east, and the Changhong road/Jinwu (Jintan-Wujin) Freeway in the south.
Together, these four roads make up the "Outer Ring Elevated Road" system.

Culture and folklore
The Changzhou dialect is a member of the Wu Chinese language family.

Other famous handicrafts of Changzhou are silk embroidery in a "crisscross" style and carvings made from green bamboo.

Noted snacks made in Changzhou include pickled radish, sesame candy, sweet glutinous rice flour dumpling with fermented glutinous rice, and silver thread noodles (also known as dragon's beard noodles).

Since 2004, Changzhou has successfully hosted China (Changzhou) International Cartoon and Digital Art Festival (CICDAF) for three times successively. With the 3-year efforts, CICDAF has basically reached the level of an international cartoon and movie festival, having vast and active influence on both the foreign and domestic cartoon industry. It has become one of the most professional and authoritative international cartoon events at the highest level. It gives new connotation to the cultural development in Changzhou, and Changzhou has ranked as the only municipal city among the first 9 “national animation and cartoon industrial bases” in China. Up to now, there are 3 incubator parks in the base with nearly 60 enterprises registered and the registered capital of nearly RMB 3 million. This year, the number of cartoons produced in the base and set by the National Bureau of Broadcasting and Television has reached 70, that is, 4,500 volumes and 50,000 minutes. A group of distinguished works have been up and coming, including the Peach Blossom Fan, which has gained many rewards both oversea and domestically. On December 12, 2006, Changzhou National Cartoon Industrial Base was awarded as “Top Ten Innovative Base with the Largest Investment Value of 2006”.

Tourism

Amusement parks
Changzhou is the home of the China Dinosaurs Park located in the Xinbei District of the city. The 5A rated Dinosaur Park has a collection of dinosaur bones and fossils from all over China. The park has 50 various fossils and more than 30 amusement programs including the Brontosaurus Roller Coaster and the Whirling Dinosaur Carriage. The fossils are located in a museum housed in a single building and the amusement rides are spread throughout the park which is categorized into six themed areas. Besides fossils and family oriented rides, Dinosaur Park is home to a giant panda and sea lions.

In 2011, a new amusement park called CC Joyland opened in Taihuwan near Taihu lake in Wujin District in the south of Changzhou.

As a National 4-A Tourist Resort of Changzhou, China Dinosaur Park is the sample base of the national science popularization education and the Chinese cultural industry. It is also a National 4-A Class Amusement Park that perfectly combines museum, hi-tech acoustic, optic and electric technology, special video effects and multimedia network and that integrates exhibition, science popularization, entertainment, leisure and participatory performances. Its central building and the core of the park is China Dinosaur Museum, which was the cooperative project of Changzhou Municipal government and the Ministry of Land and Resources (the former Ministry of Geology and Mineral Resources). It presents to the society with the most precious geological minerals through the advanced supporting facilities. The park is Pided into several parts, including China Dinosaur Museum, On-lake lawn, biological performance of the dinosaur mountain, leisure area for foreign investors and aggressive project area, etc. These parts let people feel the mysterious atmosphere of the ancient years, to see the appearance of dinosaurs, and to enjoy the modern travel atmosphere full of surprise and risks. As one of the cards of Changzhou, China Dinosaur Park, together with other scenic spots, is featuring Changzhou into a new tourist landmark in east China.

Tianning Temple and Hongmei Park
The city is also home to the Tianning Temple—one of the largest Zen Buddhist temple and monasteries in China. The city recently rebuilt the Tianning pagoda in the temple grounds, which is adjacent to Hongmei Park. The pagoda, called the Tianning Baota, was first built during the Tang Dynasty (AD 618 - 907). Since that time it has been destroyed and rebuilt five times. This makes it the tallest pagoda in China and perhaps also the world. Both the Hongmei Park and Tianning Temple are located just to the east of the city centre. 

There is the Hong Mei Park, which includes a small children's amusement park, a zoo, a rose garden and many scenic waterways. Of historical interest in the park is a historical pavilion with exhibits related to the Changzhou comb industry. In addition, there is another pavilion which displays locally produced root carvings. The park attracts large numbers of people during holidays and is often dotted with a variety of vendors.
However, the Hongmei Park has been criticized for animal abuse and overpricing in its aquarium.
Tianning Temple and Hongmei Park are served by the Hongmei Park station on Line 2 (Changzhou Metro).

As Changzhou is noted for its combs, the city has reconstructed its Fine Comb Lane area with contemporary architecture. Changzhou combs can be purchased in most places in the city.

Other sites include Changzhou's sunken city and area of archaeological ruins from the Spring and Autumn period.

Dongpo Park is located in the east part of downtown of Changzhou city, and its original name is Dongjiao Park. It covers 2.667 hectares, and is a typical Jiangnan Garden composed of cultural sites and natural landscape. During the time of south Song dynasty, the civilians of Changzhou established Yizhou Pavilion to commemorate, Su Dongpo, who was the great literature master and used to come to Changzhou. During the time of Qing dynasty, Kangxi and Qianlong, two emperors southwardly visited, they ordered to build up the temporary palace here and reconstructed this pavilion.

Changzhou also has attractive gardens such as the Wei Yuan. The Old Museum of Wisteria is also located in the city.

Sister cities
  Takatsuki, Osaka Prefecture, Japan
  Hurstville, New South Wales, Australia
  Torrington, Connecticut, United States of America
  Solihull, England, United Kingdom
  Dar es Salaam, Tanzania
  Prato, Italy
  Buffalo, New York, United States of America
  Rockford, Illinois, United States of America
  Arad, Romania
  Netanya, Israel
  Wyndham, Australia
  Curitiba, Brazil
  Minden, Germany
  Essen, Germany
  La Serena, Chile
  Niagara Falls, Canada
  Johor Bahru, Malaysia
  Tilburg, Netherlands
  Satakunta, Finland
  Jelenia Gora, Poland
  Lommel, Belgium
  Randers, Denmark
  Tomsk, Russia
  Stavropol, Russia
  Tokorozawa, Japan
  Namyangju, South Korea
  Chuncheon, South Korea
  Eskişehir, Turkey
  Beau Bassin-Rose Hill, Mauritius

Notable people
Su Dongpo (Su Shi; 1036–1101), poet and essayist.
Sheng Xuanhuai (1844–1916), late Qing Dynasty bureaucrat and reformer.
Lü Simian (1884–1957), historian and member of the Doubting Antiquity School
Zhao Yuanren (1892–1982), prominent linguist.
Hong Shen (1894–1955), pioneering dramatist and filmmaker was born here.
Yun Daiying (1895–1931), revolutionary and pioneer of early Communist Youth activities.
Liu Haisu (1896–1994), prominent artist.
Zhang Tailei (1898–1927), one of the founders of Chinese Communist Party, first Chinese ever working in Communist International.
Qu Qiubai (1899–1935), former General Secretary of the Communist Party of China and prominent Marxist thinker and writer. Named "Changzhou San Jie" together with Yun Daiying and Zhang Tailei.

Qu Qiubai, Zhang Tailei and Yun Daiying, who are called “three heroes of Changzhou”, were earlier Party leaders. They fought for the reform of China and sacrificed themselves. As one of the earlier leaders of the Party, Qu Qiubai was a Marxist, an excellent proletarian revolutionist, theorist and publicist as well as one of the founders of the revolutionary literature in China. Zhang Tailei is a name closely related to foundation of Socialist Youth League and Guangzhou Uprising. He was one of the earliest international activists in the Party as well as the link between the Party and Communist International, Youth League and Youth Communist International. He was called the “real internationalist”. Yun Daiying was one of the early Party leaders. He was also a political scientist, theorist, and leader of youth movements. He participated into and led the May Fourth Movement, the May 30th Movement, Nanchang Uprising, and Guangzhou Uprising, etc. Having been influenced by him, numerous young people stepped onto the road of reform. “Three heroes of Changzhou” are the representatives of the celebrities of Changzhou, and they will be the pride of Changzhou people.

Zhou Youguang (1906–2017), linguist often credited as the "father of Hanyu Pinyin"
Hua Luogeng (1910–1985), prominent mathematician.
Xie Zhiliu (1910–1997), prominent painter.
Tang Jun (1962–), former President of Microsoft in China.
Lu Lan (1987–), Olympic athlete and badminton player. Won the woman's championship at the 2009 BWF World Championships.

See also
 Changzhou sesame candy
 List of twin towns and sister cities in China

References

External links

Government website of Changzhou  
Changzhou city guide with open directory (Jiangsu.NET)
The history and culture of Changzhou city (Mildchina.com)
Café Zeeland - The first European style café of Changzhou 
Universities available for international students in Changzhou

 
Cities in Jiangsu